Galician nationalism is a form of nationalism found mostly in Galicia, which asserts that Galicians are a nation and that promotes the cultural unity of Galicians. The political movement referred to as modern Galician nationalism was born at the beginning of the twentieth century from the idea of Galicianism.

Ideology 
Historians, geographers and ethnologists recognize the existence of a Galician ethnic group, forming a singular unit in a specific territory. However, this is a wide conceptualization that in political terms allows many possible variants. Inside Galician nationalism two main ideological currents can be found:

 Autonomist: claims for an extended autonomy of Galicia, further devolution and (in occasions) the transformation of Spain into a federal state where Galicia would eventually achieve self-determination.
 Pro-independence: campaigns for immediate and total independence from Spain and northern territories from Portugal (Gallaecia).

Both autonomists and "independentists" have points in common, such as the defence and promotion of Galician culture and language, with some defending reintegrationism with Northern Portugal and language. Both also argue for the official and unequivocal recognition of Galicia as a nation and the defense of Galician speakers outside administrative Galician territory, in Galician-speaking areas of the Spanish regions of Asturias and Castile and León (Galicia irredenta).

It is often considered that the ideological framework of contemporary Galician nationalism was set in Alfonso Daniel Rodríguez Castelao's key work Sempre em Galiza (lit. "Always in Galicia"), published in 1944.

Political nationalism in society 
Galician nationalist candidates received 19% of the vote in the elections of 2005 and 16% in 2009.

From 2005 to 2009 Galicia was ruled by a coalition government between the Socialists' Party of Galicia (PSdeG-PSOE) and the Galician Nationalist Bloc (BNG). Unlike in other Spanish autonomous communities the conservative and pro-Spanish People's Party of Galicia (PPdeG) includes Galicianism as one of its ideological principles. Even the Spanish Socialist Party has a quite strong regional flavour in Galicia. This issue somehow explains electoral behaviour in Galicia and why nationalist parties have a reduced representation when compared to Catalonia and the Basque Country, as voters in Galicia may choose to go for Spanish parties promoting Galicianism depending on the circumstances. Spanish parties in Catalonia and the Basque Country do not have such a strong regional identity, but the Socialist Party in Catalonia has recently incorporated nationalist elements in its political discourse.

A possible explanation for this political behaviour in pro-Spanish parties is that Galician identity is so embedded in Galicians that any political party willing to participate in elections must at least show some degree of interest in the promotion of Galicianism, but how it is done may vary greatly.

The Bloque Nacionalista Galego is itself a coalition of parties, which endorse independence, but not all individual members and parallel organizations within it support that idea. At present, BNG claims for sovereignty and independence, both political and economic. Other nationalist parties stand for outright independence, and until recently they only had representatives in local councils and not in the Galician Parliament. In the 2012 election the newly formed Galician Left Alternative, which includes pro-independence groups, overtook the BNG in Parliament, winning 9 seats.

The present Galician Statute of Autonomy (1981) defines Galicia as a nationality. The Galician Government is currently drafting a new Statute of Autonomy where Galicia will most probably be defined as a nation (with declaratory but not legal value).

Nationalist political parties and nationalist organizations 
Bloque Nacionalista Galego (BNG) - "Galician Nationalist Bloc" (coalition of parties ranging from centrist to socialism and communism; pro-independence).
Unión do Povo Galego (UPG) "The Galician People's Union" (communist; pro-independence).
Galician Movement for Socialism (socialist; pro-independence).
Abrente-Galician Democratic Left (socialdemocratic; federalist).
Galiza Nova - Young Galiza, the main youth organization of the BNG (Socialism; Feminism; pro-independence).
Union of the Galician Youth - youth organization of the Galician People's Union (communist; pro-independence).
Isca! - youth organization of the Galician Movement for Socialism (socialist; feminism; pro-independence).
Anova-Nationalist Brotherhood (Socialism; pro-independence).
Galician People's Front (FPG) - (Leninism; pro-independence).
Encontro Irmandiño (EI) - "Irmandiño Gathering" (Direct democracy; Alter-globalization; Anticapitalism; pro-independence.
Xeira - youth organization of the Galician People's Front (Leninism; pro-independence).
Cerna - (Direct democracy; Anticapitalism; pro-independence).
 Commitment to Galicia - (socialdemocratic; federalist).
Máis Galiza "More Galiza" (socialdemocratic; federalist).
Acción Galega, "Galician Action" (social liberalism; federalist).
Partido Nacionalista Galego - Partido Galeguista (PNG-PG) - "Galician Nationalist Party" (centre to centre-left; federalist).
Galician Nationalist Youth - youth organization of CxG
 Alternativa Galega de Esquerda (AGE) - "Galician Left Alternative" (coalition of leftist parties created for the 2012 election, including ANOVA, Esquerda Unida-Izquierda Unida and EQUO, the former pro-independence and the latter federalist).
 Land Party - (transversal; green politics).
 Converxéncia XXI (CXXI) - "Convergence XXI" (liberal centre; European federalist, although not self-proclaimed nationalists).
 Terra Galega (TeGa) - "Galician Land" (centre to centre-right; federalist).
 Galician Coalition (CG) - (centre to centre-right; federalist).
 Partido Galeguista Demócrata (PGD) - "Galicianist Democratic Party" (centre-right to centre-left; federalist).
Galician Workers Front - (Socialism; pro-independence).
 Nós-Unidade Popular (Nós-UP) - "Us-People United" (socialist; reintegrationist).
Primeira Linha - "Front Line" (communist; pro-independence), associated with Nós-UP.
BRIGA - "Fight" or "Struggle", youth organization of Nós-UP (communist; pro-independence; feminist)
AGIR - "REACT", student organization of Nós-Unidade Popular (communist; pro-independence).
 Causa Galiza - "Cause Galiza" (Socialism; pro-independence).
Galician Convergence - (centre to centre-right; federalist),
 Assembleia da Mocidade Independentista (AMI) - "Assembly of the Independentist Youth" (libertarian socialist, pro-independence, feminist).
Espazo Ecosocialista Galego - Galician Ecosocialist Space (Ecosocialism, federalism).
Confederación Intersindical Galega - Galician Union Confederacy, main union in Galicia, specially close to the BNG (Anticapitalism; pro-independence).
Central Unitaria de Traballadores - "Workers Unitary Central", union close to the Galician People's Front (Anticapitalism; pro-independence). 
Sindicato Labrego Galego-Comisións Labregas - Agrarian union. Independent, but close to Anova-Nationalist Brotherhood.
FRUGA - agrarian union close to the BNG.
Galician Student League - student union. Independent, but close to the Galician Movement for Socialism (Anticapitalism; feminism; pro-independence).
Comités - student union. Close to Galiza Nova.
 Resistência Galega - armed organization. Its actual existence is disputed.

See also 
Galicianism
Galicia (Spain)
Galician language
Galician people
Galicia irredenta
Galicia–North Portugal Euroregion
Galicia independence
Nationalities in Spain
Pan-Celticism

References

 Beramendi, J. and Núñez Seixas, X.M. (1996): O nacionalismo galego, A Nosa Terra, Vigo.
 Beswicj, J.E. (2007): Regional Nationalism in Spain: Language use and ethnic identity in Galicia, Multilingual Matters
 García-Álvarez, J. (1998): "Substate nation-building and geographical representations of 'The Other' in Galicia, Spain (1860-1936)", in Finisterra, no. 33, issue 65, p. 117-128.
 Fernández Baz, M.A., (2003): A formación do nacionalismo galego contemporáneo (1963-1984), Laiovento.
 Núñez Seixas, X.M.(1993): Historiographical approaches to nationalism in Spain, Saarbrücken,  Breitenbach.
 Núñez Seixas, X.M.(1999): "Autonomist regionalism within the spanish state of the Autonomous Communities: an interpretation", in Nationalism & ethnic politics, vol. 5, no. 3-4, p. 121-141. Frank Cass, Ilford.
 Rios Bergantinhos, N. (2002): A esquerda independentista galega (1977-1995), Abrente Editora, Compostela.
 Rodríguez Polo, X.R. (2009): O triunfo do galeguismo. Opinión pública, partidos políticos e comportamento electoral na transición autonómica, Xerais, Vigo.

Notes

External links
Causa Galiza, organization which seeks to co-ordinate all pro-independence political parties and organizations in a single front 
Galiza Livre, pro-independence news portal 
History of Galician nationalism (web Galicia espallada) 
Galician nationalism 
Eurominority (main site, in English and French)